Nationality words link to articles with information on the nation's poetry or literature (for instance, Irish or France).

Works

Great Britain

 George Chapman, translator, Petrarchs Seven Penitentiall Psalms, Paraphrastically Translated
 William Corkine, Second Booke of Ayres, some to sing and play to the Basse-Violl alone: others to be sung to the Lute and Bass Viollin, including "Break of Day" by John Donne
 John Davies, The Muses Sacrifice
 John Donne, The First Anniversarie, An Anatomie of the World [...] The Second Anniversarie. Of the Progres of the Soule, anonymously published together, although The Second Anniversarie has a separate, dated, title page (and was originally published as An Anatomy of the World 1611)
 John Dowland, A Pilgrimes Solace, verse and music
 Michael Drayton, Poly-Olbion, Part I, a topographical poem describing England and Wales; with notes by John Selden (Part 2 published 1622)
 Orlando Gibbons, First Set of Madrigals and Mottets
 Richard Johnson, A Crowne-Garland of Goulden Roses, Gathered Out of Englands Royal Garden
 The Passionate Pilgrim, expanded edition, anthology
 Henry Peacham, the younger, Minerva Britannia; or, A Garden of Heroical Devises
 Samuel Rowlands:
 The Knave of Cubbes, published anonymously; the first edition (for which no copy is extant), titled A Merry Meeting, published 1600 but was ordered burned
 The Knave of Harts, published anonymously
 "W.S." (but probably by John Ford), A Funeral Elegy for Master William Peter
 John Taylor, The Sculler

On the death of Prince Henry
See also 1613 in poetry

The November 6 death of Henry Frederick, Prince of Wales, at age 18, occasioned these poems:
 Sir William Alexander, An Elegie on the Death of Prince Henrie, on the death of Henry Frederick, Prince of Wales
 Joshua Sylvester, Lachrimae Lachrimarum; or, The Distillation of Teares Shede for the Untimely Death of the Incomparable Prince Panaretus, also includes poems in English, French, Latin and Italian by Walter Quin (A third edition was published in 1613.)
 George Wither, Prince Henries Obsequies; or, Mournefull Elegies Upon his Death

Other
Luis de Góngora - Fábula de Polifemo y Galatea (Fable of Polyphemus and Galatea) Spain
 Jean Vauquelin de La Fresnaye, Les Œuvres ("Works"), published posthumously in Caen, France

Births
 February 8 – Samuel Butler (died 1680), English
 March – Sir Thomas Salusbury, 2nd Baronet (died 1643), Welsh politician and poet
 March 4 (bapt.) – Jan Vos (died 1667), Dutch playwright and poet
 March 20 – Anne Bradstreet, née Dudley (died 1672), "the chief poetess of Colonial America", English-born Puritan poet
 October 15 – Isaac de Benserade (died 1691), French playwright and court poet, a member of the Académie française in 1674
 October 25 – James Graham (died 1650), 5th Earl and 1st Marquis of Montrose (Scottish) soldier and poet
 Also:
 Edward King (drowned 1637), Irish poet who wrote in Latin in England; a friend of John Milton
 Zhou Lianggong (died 1672), Chinese poet, essayist and art historian
 Łukasz Opaliński (died 1666), Polish nobleman, poet, writer and political activist

Deaths
 May 20 (bur.) – William Fowler (born c. 1560), Scottish-born poet, writer, courtier and translator
 July 24 – John Salusbury (born 1567), Welsh knight, politician and poet
 October – Juan de la Cueva (born 1543), Spanish dramatist and poet
 October 7 – Giovanni Battista Guarini (born 1538), Italian poet, dramatist and diplomat
 November 20 – Sir John Harington (born 1560), English courtier, author, poet and inventor of a flush toilet
 Also – Ercole Bottrigari (born 1531), Italian scholar, mathematician, poet, music theorist, architect and composer

Notes

17th-century poetry
Poetry